Wagner is a given name. Notable people with the name include:

Wagner Diniz Gomes de Araújo (born 1983), Brazilian football player
Wagner Ferreira dos Santos (born 1985), Brazilian football player
Wagner (singer), full name Wagner Fiuza-Carrilho, Brazilian singer and participant in The X Factor
Wagner Jorgensen (1913–1977), American football player
Wagner Lamounier, Brazilian singer
Wagner Lopes (born 1969), Japanese football player
Wagner Moura (born 1976), Brazilian actor
Wagner Pereira Cardozo (born 1966), Brazilian football player and coach
Wagner Ricardo Silva da Silva (born 1991), Brazilian football player
Wagner Santos Lago (born 1978), Brazilian football player
Wagner Tiso (born 1945), Brazilian musician

See also

Wágner, given name and surname
Vagner, given name and surname